City of Wagga Wagga is a local government area in the Riverina region of southern New South Wales, Australia.

The Mayor of the City of Wagga Wagga is Cr. Dallas Tout, an independent politician.

City, town and localities
The City of Wagga Wagga includes the suburbs of

History

Wagga Wagga was first incorporated as the Borough of Wagga Wagga on 15 March 1870. It received city status and became the City of Wagga Wagga on 17 April 1946. The municipality enlarged substantially on 1 January 1981 when the adjoining Shire of Kyeamba and Shire of Mitchell were amalgamated into the City.

Heritage listings
The City of Wagga Wagga has a number of heritage-listed sites, including:
 , Main Southern railway: Bomen railway station
 , Tarcutta Street: Hambledon Homestead
 Wagga Wagga, Botanic Gardens Site (BGS), Baden Powell Drive: Mobile Cook's Galley, Museum of the Riverina
 Wagga Wagga, Main Southern railway: Wagga Wagga railway station

Demographics
Aboriginal and Torres Strait Islander people made up 5.6 per cent of the population, which was twice the national average of 2.9 per cent. The median age of people in the City of Wagga Wagga was 35 years, which was lower than the national median of 38 years. Children aged 0 – 14 years made up 20.3 per cent of the population and people aged 65 years and over made up 15.2 per cent of the population. Of people in the area aged 15 years and over, 46.6 per cent were married and 11.4 per cent were either divorced or separated.

Population growth in the Tamworth Regional Council between the 2011 census and the 2016 census was 4.92 per cent. When compared with total population growth of Australia for the same period, being 8.8 per cent, population growth in the City of Wagga Wagga local government area was around half of the national average. The median weekly income of $1,354 within the City of Wagga Wagga local government area was slightly lower than the national average of $1,438.

Approximately two-thirds (67%) of all residents in the City of Wagga Wagga nominated a religious affiliation with Christianity at the 2016 census, which was higher than the national average of approximately 60 per cent. Meanwhile, as at the census date, compared to the national average, households in the City of Wagga Wagga local government area had a significantly lower than average proportion (7.6 per cent) where two or more languages are spoken (national average was 26.4 per cent); and a significantly higher proportion (87.8 per cent) where English only was spoken at home (national average was 68.5 per cent).

Council

Current composition and election method
Wagga Wagga City Council (WWCC) is composed of nine Councillors elected proportionally as a single ward. All Councillors are elected for a fixed four-year term of office. The Mayor is elected by the Councillors at the first meeting of the Council. The most recent election was held on 25 October 2021, and the makeup of the Council is as follows:

The current Council, elected in 2021, is:

A referendum was held on 8 September 2012 and an absolute majority of voters resolved in favour to reduce the number of Councillors from eleven to nine. The change came into effect at the September 2016 elections.

Administration staff
In December 2009, Wagga Wagga City Council announced that it had appointed Phil Pinyon as the General Manager of the Wagga Wagga City Council replacing Lyn Russell, who suddenly announced her resignation in October 2009, after completing 18 months of her five-year contract.

Cutting ties with China Sister City
In April 2020, The Wagga council voted to cut ties with China's Kunming city, a week later they would vote again joining Kunming as a sister city.

Symbols and emblems
Crows are considered a symbol of the city of Wagga Wagga, appearing in the council's logo, coat of arms, and throughout local business logos and public artworks. This is due to the debated interpretation of 'Wagga Wagga' being derived from a Wiradjuri term meaning 'place of many crows'. The floral emblem for the city is the Silver Banksia.

Gallery

See also
 Riverina Water County Council

References

External links

Wagga Wagga City Council website

 
Local government areas of the Riverina
Local government areas of New South Wales
Wagga Wagga